Monarch Place is a commercial office tower with ground-floor retail spaces, located in Springfield, Massachusetts. Monarch Place is the tallest building in Springfield, the tallest building in Massachusetts outside of Boston, and the eighth tallest building in New England outside of Boston. Originally built by the namesake Monarch Capital Corporation, at the time of its completion in 1989 it was the largest mixed-use development in Massachusetts outside of Boston.

History
Monarch Place was built on the site of the Forbes and Wallace Inc. Department Store, commencing construction in 1987. In a tribute to preserve the heritage of Forbes and Wallace, whose flagship store had stood at that site for decades, the architects Jung Brannen and Associates developed a replica of that building's facade, used in tandem with a fountain at a plaza at the corners of Main and Boland. The building was originally constructed as a joint venture between the Monarch Capital Corporation's "Forge Springfield" subsidiary, Flatley Springfield of Braintree, and Sheraton Hotels at a cost of $120 million dollars. After Monarch Capital's bankruptcy in 1991, the building was sold at auction for $24 million dollars to Peter L. Picknelly, of Peter Pan Buslines, whose company has managed it since.

Since 1989, working with the Massachusetts Division of Fisheries and Wildlife, the building's rooftop has on-and-off served as the site of a nesting pair of peregrine falcons, making it one of three reintroduction sites on buildings in Western Massachusetts, including the UMass Campus Center site which subsequently was moved to the W.E.B. DuBois Library in Amherst.

Tenants
As of December 2021, tenants include:

Gallery

See also
 Metro Center, Springfield, Massachusetts
Tower Square

References

External links

 Official website maintained by Peter Pan Properties
 Sheraton Monarch Place Hotel, Marriott Hotels

Springfield
Jung Brannen buildings
1980s architecture in the United States
Postmodern architecture in the United States
Tallest buildings, Springfield
Tallest buildings, Springfield
1986 establishments in Massachusetts